George Congdon Gorham (July 5, 1832 in Greenport, Suffolk County, New York

– February 11, 1909) was a Republican California politician, newspaper editor, and author. Gorham ran in 1867 under the Republican ticket in the Californian gubernatorial race. He lost, however, to Democratic candidate Henry Huntly Haight by a margin of 7,458 votes. Gorham also worked on the Republican National Committee for California (a subsidiary body of the national body, the Republican National Committee). He, along with Stephen Johnson Field wrote a book on the early history of California. From June 6, 1868, until March 24, 1879, he was secretary of the United States Senate. From 1880 to 1884 he was editor of the National Republican newspaper. In retirement he wrote an authoritative two-volume biography of Edwin Stanton, Abraham Lincoln's secretary of war.  He died in 1909 in Washington D.C.

During the 1880 Republican National Convention, Gorham served as a delegate allied with the party's "Stalwart" wing.

References

External links 
 
 
 Senate history - Gorham as Secretary of the Senate

1832 births
1909 deaths
California Republicans
Stalwarts (Republican Party)
Secretaries of the United States Senate